The Sri Lanka Railways Class S5 is a diesel multiple unit (DMU) built by Hitachi and introduced to Sri Lanka between 1969 and 1970, only two of which were imported. The class was built with modern interior facilities aiming towards the special train tours market.

Description 
A one-train set consists of 2 power cars (including the engine) and 3 passenger cars. Previous classes of DMUs in Sri Lanka had only one power car; with their extra capacity, ClassS5s can operate on upcountry main lines. Total passenger capacity of this DMU is 100.

Facilities 
The train comprises a buffet car and a kitchen; all passenger cars were air conditioned. There was also an automatic door system which was later removed. There was an interior communication system.

Operations 
This class can be operated in any railway line in Sri Lanka except Kelani Valley Line. This was only used for chartered services and has performed in upcountry line several times.

Incidents 
In 1970 due to an accident engine of No. 720 power car was destroyed. This 717-720 train-set were later refurbished with only one engine per train.

Acquisition By Airport & Aviation Services Limited 
One S5 DMU (718-719) was chartered by Sri Lanka Airport & Aviation Services Limited and this was repainted in light blue and dark blue livery. The new painted S5's inaugural run was for IIFA Awards guests to Colombo Fort from Katunayake.

Gallery

See also
 Sri Lanka Railways
 Diesel locomotives of Sri Lanka

References 

S5
Train-related introductions in 1969